Kakanwada is a village, in Sangrampur tehsil of Buldhana district of the Indian state of Maharashtra.

Geography
Kakanwada consists of two census villages Kakanwada Bk and Kanawada Kh. It is split by Vaan River.

Nearby villages include Tamgaon, Bodkha, Wakana, Ladnapur, Tunki, Sagoda, Palsoda, Dhamangaon, Palsi Zasi, Kolad, Bawanbir, Wadgaon Pr Adgaon, Kolad, Pimpri Adgaon, Niwana, Banoda Eklara, Jamod, Durgadatiya, Wankhed, Danapur, Hingani Bk, Raikhed, Belkhed, Gadegaon, Tudgaon, Isapur and Malegaon Bazar.

Nearby towns are Sonala, Akot, Sangrampur, Jalgaon Jamod, Telhara and Shegaon.

Demographics
 India census, Kakanwada Br and Kakanwada Kh had a population of 1462 and 1010, respectively.

References

Villages in Buldhana district